Arnold Vaatz (born 9 August 1955) is a German politician of represents the Christian Democratic Union (CDU) who served as a member of the Bundestag from the state of Saxony from 1998 until 2021.

Political career 
Vaatz became a member of the Bundestag after the 1998 German federal election. He was a member of the Committee on Education, Research and Technology Assessment and the Committee on Petitions.
Vaatz did not stand for reelection in the 2021 German federal election.

References

External links 

  
 Bundestag biography 

1955 births
Living people
Members of the Bundestag for Saxony
Members of the Bundestag 2017–2021
Members of the Bundestag 2013–2017
Members of the Bundestag 2009–2013
Members of the Bundestag 2005–2009
Members of the Bundestag 2002–2005
Members of the Bundestag 1998–2002
People from Weida, Thuringia
Members of the Bundestag for the Christian Democratic Union of Germany
Recipients of the Order of Merit of the Free State of Saxony